WTU may refer to

Warrior Transition Unit
Washington Theological Union
West Texas Utilities
World Technological University, an old name for Moscow Technological Institute
World Trade University
West Texas Underground Wrestling